The KW Fall Classic is an annual bonspiel, or curling tournament, that takes place at the Kitchener-Waterloo Granite Club in Waterloo, Ontario. The tournament has been held as part of the men's and women's Ontario Curling Tour, and both the men's and women's events were  included in the World Curling Tour starting in 2013. It is considered a "development tour" event.

Past champions
''Only skip's name is displayed.

Men

Women

References

External links

Ontario Curling Tour events
Sport in Waterloo, Ontario
Annual sporting events